Whitecourt crater is a meteorite impact crater in central Alberta, Canada, located approximately  southeast of the Town of Whitecourt within Woodlands County. It is remarkable for being unusually well-preserved for a crater of small size and relatively young age.

The crater was found by Sonny Stevens, a resident of Whitecourt, on July 3, 2007. Stevens was hunting in the area, and later found the first fragments of the meteorite while metal detecting on the crater rim. The meteoritic nature of the fragments, and thus the authenticity of the crater, were confirmed by Dr. Chris Herd, professor of Earth and Atmospheric Sciences at the University of Alberta. The area has been placed within a 200-metre by 200-metre protected zone, within which collecting is prohibited and subject to a $50,000 fine or one year in jail. However, the vast majority of fragments have been found on Crown land beyond the protected area.

More than 3,000 pieces of the impacting meteorite have been found (as of 2012). The pieces are shrapnel, mostly between a few grams and 500 grams in mass, with sharp edges and mechanically deformed from the impact, but showing no sign of impact melt.  Over one dozen individual (non-shrapnel pieces that show regmaglypts) meteorites have also been found with the largest weighing 31 kilograms. The meteorite fragments are irons of type IIIAB. Most fragments were ejected eastward from the crater.

References

External links 
Aerial Exploration of the Whitecourt crater
Whitecourt Meteorite Impact Crater

Holocene impact craters
Impact craters of Alberta
Whitecourt
Woodlands County
Provincial Historic Resources of Alberta